El Dibir District is a district in the north-central Mudug region of Somalia. Its capital lies at El Dibir.

References

Districts of Somalia
Mudug